Konrad Łukasz Niedźwiedzki (born 2 January 1985, Polish pronunciation: [ˈkɔnɾat ɲɛd͡ʑˈvʲjɛt͡ski]) is a Polish long track speed skater who participates in international competitions.

Personal life
Konrad Niedźwiedzki was born in Warsaw, Poland. His father Krzysztof is coach of Polish national speed skating team. Konrad dated with Katarzyna Woźniak also speed skater.

Olympic Games 
In the 2013 World Single Distance Championships in Sochi, Russia, Niedźwiedzki won the bronze medal in the men's team pursuit together with Zbigniew Bródka and Jan Szymański. The same result was reached at the 2014 Winter Olympics which was held at the same venue.

Personal records

Career highlights

Olympic Winter Games
2006 – Torino, 13th at 1000 m
2006 – Torino, 12th at 1500 m
World Allround Championships
2006 – Calgary, 8th
World Single Distance Championships
2005 – Inzell, 14th at 1500 m
European Allround Championships
2005 – Heerenveen, 22nd
2006 – Hamar, 14th
2007 – Collalbo, 13th
2008 – Kolomna,  13th
World Cup
2004 – Hamar, 3rd  at team pursuit
2005 – Baselga di Pinè, 3rd  at team pursuit
World Junior Allround Championships
2001 – Groningen, 34th
2002 – Collalbo, 12th
2004 – Roseville, Minnesota, 13th
National Championships
2003 – Warsaw,  3rd at 1500 m
2004 – Tomaszów Mazowiecki,  2nd at 1500 m
2004 – Tomaszów Mazowiecki,  3rd at 1000 m
2004 – Sanok,  2nd at sprint
2007 – Warsaw,  3rd at 500 m
2007 – Warsaw,  3rd at 5000 m
2007 – Warsaw,  1st at 1500 m
2007 – Warsaw,  1st at 1000 m
Nordic Junior Games
2004 – Berlin,  1st at 1500 m
2004 – Berlin,  3rd at 3000 m
2004 – Berlin,  1st at 1000 m

References

External links 
 
 Konrad Niedźwiedzki at Jakub Majerski's Speedskating Database

1985 births
Living people
Polish male speed skaters
Speed skaters at the 2006 Winter Olympics
Speed skaters at the 2010 Winter Olympics
Speed skaters at the 2014 Winter Olympics
Speed skaters at the 2018 Winter Olympics
Olympic speed skaters of Poland
Medalists at the 2014 Winter Olympics
Olympic medalists in speed skating
Olympic bronze medalists for Poland
Speed skaters from Warsaw
World Single Distances Speed Skating Championships medalists
Universiade medalists in speed skating
Universiade gold medalists for Poland
Universiade silver medalists for Poland
Universiade bronze medalists for Poland
Speed skaters at the 2007 Winter Universiade
Competitors at the 2009 Winter Universiade
Medalists at the 2007 Winter Universiade
21st-century Polish people